Shooting Gazette is a monthly field sports magazine published by Future plc.

Shooting Gazette covers all aspects of driven shooting, both in the UK and abroad. It includes advice on gamekeeping, regular interviews with leading figures in the shooting industry, and reviews of new shotguns, shooting clothing and equipment. A gundog section offers advice on training and breeding, as well as reporting on gundog trials around the country.

Shooting Gazette is currently the official magazine of the Countryside Alliance Shooting Campaign.

Will Hetherington has been the editor since July 2004.

History
Founded in Lincolnshire in 1989, originally as a quarterly publication, the magazine, then called The Shooting Gazette, became a bi-monthly in October/November of that year. EMAP traded the title to IPC Media in 1996 in exchange for Classic Cars.

References

External links 
Shooting Gazette

1989 establishments in the United Kingdom
Monthly magazines published in the United Kingdom
Quarterly magazines published in the United Kingdom
Sports magazines published in the United Kingdom
Firearms magazines
Hunting and fishing magazines
Magazines established in 1989
Mass media in Lincolnshire